William Fullerton may refer to:
 William Fullerton (politician) (1888–?), Australian politician
 William Young Fullerton (1857–1932), Irish hymnwriter
 William Morton Fullerton (1865–1952), American journalist
 William Fullerton (lawyer) (1817–1900), American lawyer
 William Fullerton Jr. (1854–1888), his son, American-born composer in London
 Billy Fullerton, see the song Billy Boys
 William Fullerton (diplomat) (born 1939), British diplomat
 William Fullerton (surgeon) (died 1805), Scottish surgeon

See also
 William Fullarton (disambiguation)